Brudebuketten is a 1953 Norwegian comedy film directed by Bjørn Breigutu, starring Randi Kolstad, Lalla Carlsen and Per Aabel.

Cast 

 Randi Kolstad as Siv Blom
 Lalla Carlsen as Berthe
 Per Aabel as Høyland jr.
 Lauritz Falk as Victor Wahlin
 Jørn Ording as Picasso, artist
 Wenche Foss as a bard
 Kari Diesen as bathing guest
 Fridtjof Mjøen as psychiatrist
 Aud Schønemann as Mirakel, housekeeper
 Sigrun Otto as a dutiful mother
 Paal Rocky as head of department
 Guri Stormoen as hostess
 Anne Lise Wang as mannequin
 Jon Sund as hotel porter
 Arne Bang-Hansen as the Stockholm traveler
 Britta Lech-Hanssen as The Stockholm Farmer's Wife
 Eva Steen as lady in the shop
 Leif Omdal as an art dealer
 Lillemor Grimsgaard as a lady
 Topsy Håkansson as a mannequin
 Greta Syrdahl as an art-loving lady
 Turid Balke as secretary
 Svein Byhring as messenger

External links
 
 Brudebuketten at Filmweb.no (Norwegian)

1953 films
1953 comedy films
Norwegian comedy films
Norwegian black-and-white films